= Ernst Christoph Barchewitz =

German writer (1687–1758)

Ernst Christoph Barchewitz (1687–1758) was a German travel writer and an officer in the Dutch East India Company.

== Works ==
- Barchewitz, Ernst Christoph (1730). Thur. Allerneuste und Wahrhaffte Cost Indianische Reise Beschreibung. Darrinnen I. Seine durch Teutsch und Holland nach Indien Gethane Reise. II Sein Eilffjahriger Auffenthalt auf Java, Banda, &c. III. Siene Rück Reise. Chemnitz.

== Sources ==
- De Wit, H. C. D. (1951). "Contributions to the History of Botany and Exploration in Malaysia—7". Reinwardtia. Vol. 1, Part 2. Kebun Raya Indonesia: Herbarium Bogoriense. pp. 67–73.
